Lubomir Mykytiuk is a Canadian actor. He is most noted for his regular supporting role as Gerry Kisilenko in the television drama series North of 60, for which he won the Gemini Award for Best Supporting Actor in a Drama Program or Series at the 11th Gemini Awards in 1997.

He was previously part of the theatre collective that created and performed the theatrical premiere of the influential Canadian play Paper Wheat.

References

External links

20th-century Canadian male actors
21st-century Canadian male actors
Canadian male television actors
Canadian male film actors
Canadian male stage actors
Best Supporting Actor in a Drama Series Canadian Screen Award winners
Living people
Year of birth missing (living people)